T.M Saraboji Also known as Mani Maran (மணி மாறன்)
 (born 23 March 1970), is one of the Tamil scholars Tamil Nadu. He is working as Tamil Pandit at Saraswathi Mahal Library located at Tanjore in Tamil Nadu. He is interested in Tamil language, art, culture and manuscriptology and is contributed in these areas.

Books

Publications of Saraswathi Mahal Library 
 Tamil Ennum Eluthum
 Tamilari Madanthai Kathai.
 Tamil Research Articles, 2012
 Azhagar Anthathi (Editor), 2012
 Sarabendra Boopala Kuravanji (Editor), 2013 
 Arapalisvara Sathakam (Editor), 2014
 Tirukaruvai Pathitruppathanthadhi by Athiveerama Pandiyar(Editor), 2016

Other works
 Tamil in three letters (Vaishmathi Publications, Thanjavur), 2004
 Dr Kudavayil Balasubramanian, Department of Tamilology, Annamalai University and Indology Department, Malaya University, (Kalaigan Publishers, Madras), 2015
 Pandit Asalambikai Ammayar, Department of Tamilology, Annamalai University and Indology Department, Malaya University, (Kalaigan Publishers, Madras), 2016

Manuscriptology workshop
He was the co-ordinator for the conduct of workshop on Manuscriptology.

Findings 
 Found Chola era well in Vettar (சோழர் காலத்து உறை கிணறு வெட்டாற்றில் கண்டுபிடிப்பு) 
 Found Chola era Amman and Sivalinga in Onbattuveli (ஒன்பத்துவேலியில் சோழர் கால அம்மன், சிவலிங்கம் சிலைகள்) Dinamani, Tamil daily, 1 February 2014
 Chola period sculptures near Thanjavur (தஞ்சாவூர் அருகே சோழர் கால சிலைகள்) Dinamani, Tamil daily, 10 January 2014
 Chola period sculpture found (சோழர் கால சிற்பம் கண்டெடுப்பு) Dinamalar, Tamil daily, 18 April 2013
 9th century sculptures found near Thanjavur, The New Indian Express, 16 April 2013 
 Chola period Nandhi found in Thanjavur  (தஞ்சையில் சோழர் கால நந்தி சிற்பம் கண்டெடுப்பு) Dinamalar, Tamil daily, 31 January 2013 
 1000 year old Chola era sculptures found Dinamalar, Tamil daily, 24 January 2013
 Chola period Nandhi found in dilapidated temple (சிதைந்த கோவிலில் சோழர் கால நந்தி சிலை), தினமலர், 3 September 2012

References

External links
 மணி.மாறன்
 Sarabendra Boopala Kuravanji (சரபேந்திர பூபாலக்குறவஞ்சி)

Living people
Tamil scholars
People from Thanjavur district
1970 births